Torstein Aagaard-Nilsen (born 11 January 1964, in Oslo) is a Norwegian contemporary composer.

Life 
Aagaard-Nilsen grew up in Kabelvåg on Lofoten in northern Norway. From 1986 to 1990 he studied at the Bergen Conservatory of Music (now known as the Grieg Academy) and at the University of Bergen. From 1990 to 1994 he worked at the Bergen Conservatory as a teacher of contemporary classical music. Furthermore, he was leader of the Autunnale-festivalen - (Music Factory and Autunnale), also in Bergen. In 1992 and 1993 he arranged and composed for the Forsvarets Stabsmusikkorps Vestlandet - Norwegian Army Band, Bergen (NABB), writing, among other works, Arctic Landscape. In this period Aagaard-Nilsen wrote many works for wind band and brass band.

Aagaard-Nilsen works as conductor of various school and amateur orchestras, and also as a teacher at the Manger Folkehøgskule. He founded the forum Av garde together with Ketil Hvoslef, Jostein Stalheim and Knut Vaage.

As a composer he has written for orchestra, chamber ensemble, choir, wind band and brass band. Works that exemplify Aagard-Nilsen's focus on narrative and visual aspects in a nearly impulsive form include Fabula I and Fabula II (1996), Sinfonietta (1998) and The Season of Blue Lights (2008) commissioned by BIT20 Ensemble. A stronger focus on expressive elements in Aagard-Nilsen's output is evident in works such as Pierrot's Lament (Concerto for Euphonium and Orchestra), premiered in 2001 with the Lahti Symphony Orchestra. The trumpet concerto Blue Phrases (2007), the sinfonietta The Season of Blue Light and quartet Blue Fragments (2008) are additional examples of Aagard-Nilsen's expressive focus; while the orchestral work Boreas Sings (2012) represents a new direction in which a spectrum of colours and dancing rhythms become evident. 2014 saw his orchestral work Boreas Blæs (2014) premiered by the Norwegian Arctic Philharmonic Orchestra at the opening ceremony of Stormen, Bodø's concert hall.

In 2016 Aagard-Nilsen received the Norwegian Music Publishing Association's Annual Award for his work Dirty Dancing, commissioned and premiered by the Christiania Blåseensemble in 2015.

Compositions

For orchestra 
 1992/2000 The fourth Angel for trumpet and sinfonietta
 1995–1996 Concerto for Cello and Orchestra
 1996 Concerto for Trumpet and String Orchestra - Hommage
 1997 rev.2003 The Cry of Fenrir - Concerto for Tuba and Orchestra
 1998 Concerto for Trombone and String Orchestra
 2000 Pierrot's Lament - Concerto for Euphonium and Orchestra
 2003 Fanfares and Fairytales (Concerto No. 2 for Trombone and Orchestra)
 2007 "Wind Eyes"

For wind band 
 1992 Arctic Landscape for Military Band
 1994 Preludium for Symphonic Band
 1994 Triade - "The Angels of Destruction" for large wind ensemble
 1998 Pang - Introduction No. 4 for Symphonic Band
 2001 Concerto for Large Wind Ensemble (Pentagram)
 Call and Awakening
 Ritual I
 De Profundis
 Ritual II
 Call and Conclusion
 2002 Cantilena Cradle Song for solo trombone and wind band
 2002 Wings of Changes for Wind Ensemble (Recordinglabel SIMAX)
 2002 "Cantilena: Cradle song for trombone and wind band"
 2004 Cantilena II: Mountain Song for euphonium and wind ensemble
 2004 "The Playground Project"
 2006 "Cantilena III for 3 trombones and wind ensemble
 2013 Ljodgata for Wind Band
 2015 Dirty Dancing, premiered by Christiania Blåseensemble conducted by Peter Szilvay

For brass band 
 1988 Circius (various recordings)
 1989 Abstractions
 1990 Entrada : Introduction No. 2
 1990-1991 Awakening
 1991 The Binding of the Wolf
 1993 Concerto for Bb Cornet and Brass Band  
 1996 Seid (also a version B from 2009) (recording on DOYEN)
 1998 Riffs and Interludes
 1998/1999 Dynamis - Missa Sophia (recording on LAWO)
 1999 "Mosquito for trombone and brass band
 2002/2005 "Myth"
 2003 Aubade - Dawn Songs of the Fabulous Birds (test piece for the 2003 European Brass Band Competition in Bergen, Norway)
 2003 Bloodaxe Lament for Tuba and Brass Band 
 2005 "Klotho"
 2005 Hommage á Wolfgang Amadeus Mozart
 2006 "Steam Songs"
 2006 Cantigas (recording on LAWO)
 2007 "Blue Phrases" for solo trumpet, electronics and brass band
 2007 "Chant" (recording on LAWO)
 2007/2008 "Totem" Concerto gross for brass band and electronics
 2009 "Euphonium Concerto"

For choir 
 1992 Ensomme skip for female choir (SSAA) - text (Norwegian): Rolf Jacobsen
 1994/2010 Bølgje for mixed choir - text (Norwegian): Halldis Moren Vesaas
 1996 "I otta du rise" for male choir (TTBB)
 2001/2002 Aldri før... for mixed choir - text (Norwegian): Rolf Jacobsen
 2002 Et annet lys for mixed choir - text (Norwegian): Stein Mehren
 2005 "Sorg" fir male choir - text (Norwegian): Stein Mehren
 2008 "Jolekvad (variations on In Dulci Jubilo) for two female choir

Vocal works with orchestral or instrumental accompaniment 
 1990/1991 Jacobsen sanger for baritone and trumpet text: Rolf Jacobsen
 1999 Det andre lyset for voice, saxophone, trombone and piano text: Stein Mehren

Cantatas and masses 
 1994 Vår jord, vår Evighet cantata for Tromsø on the occasion of the 200-year anniversary, for soprano, baritone, mixed choir, wind band and strings - text: Rolf Jacobsen
 Preludium
 Det ryker
 Små lys på havet
 Nord
 Sol i sorg
 Hyss
 1998/1999 Dynamis - Missa sophia for cornet, trombone, tuba, percussion and brass band

Piano 
 1993 Hot-house - Drivhus
 2000/2002 "Views" 
 2006 "Akvarell (Watercolour) (for Rune Alver)
 2008 "Nattsvermer (for Rune Alver)
 2009 "Lofotbrev (for Rune Alver)
 2010 "Blue Traces" (for Rune Alver)

Chamber music 
 1989/95 "Four Lyric Pieces" for solo EUphonium
 1990 "Black Rain" for solo Euphonium
 1991 Black Light for recorder, violin, singer (alto) and piano, version 2: for recorder, violin, cello and harpsichord, version 3: for flute, oboe, violin and piano
 1992/2001 "The Fourth Angel" for trumpet and sinfonietta
 1993 Novelle for Brass Ensemble for 4 trumpets, 3 trombones, bass trombone, French horn and tuba
 1996 Fabula I for flute, clarinet, vibraphone, piano, 2 violins, viola, cello and double bass
 1996 Fabula II for oboe, bassoon, French horn, trumpet, trombone, percussion, 2 violins, viola, cello and double bass
 1996/98 "Sinfonietta" (1. Fabula III, 2. Fabula IV, 3. Fabula V, 4. Singing Landscape) for sinfonietta
 1998 Crossing Lines quartet for trombone, accordion, violin and cello
 1998 Glance of a Landscape quartet for percussion
 1999 Light for trombone and percussion
 1999 "Two Insects" for Solo Euphonium
 2000 "Spin" for brass quintet
 2001 "Kyklos" for brass quintet
 2002 Winds of Change for Oboe, Eb clarinet, 3 Bb clarinets, Bass Clarinet, and 2 Saxophones
 2003 "Knock" for percussion trio
 2005 "Of Night and Darkness" for trombone quartet
 2008 "Blue Fragments" for Piano trio and percussion
 2008 "The Season of Blue Lights" for sinfonietta
 2009 "Song for Kharon" for tuba and electronics
 2010 "Orpheus Lament" for trumpet and electronics
 2016 "Musical Doodles" for accordion and cello

Discography
Rune Alver, Blaue Blume (2011)
Staff Band of the Norwegian Armed Forces, Håkon Austbø, Peter Szilvay, Oiseaux exotiques (2009)
Eikanger-Bjørsvik Musikklag, Staff Band of the Norwegian Armed Forces, Frisk Pust (2008)
Ning Trio, Works by Barrett, Hagen, Buene, Aagaard-Nilsen, Apollyon (2004)
Bodø Sinfonietta, Singing Landscape (2003)
Helge Haukås, Jaren Marching Band, Silver Mountain (2002)
Einar Røttingen, Avgarde (2000)
Rolf Gupta, Stavanger Brass Band, The Colour-Gobbler: Stavanger Brass Band presents contemporary brass band music (1996)
Eikanger-Bjørsvik Musikklag, Kings Messenger (1995)
David King,  Introduction (1995)
Eikanger-Bjørsvik Musikklag, Light (1990)

References

External links 
 
 List of works supplied by the National Library of Norway

1964 births
Living people
Grieg Academy alumni
Composers from Oslo
Norwegian contemporary classical composers
Norwegian male classical composers
Brass band composers